Private Chefs of Beverly Hills is a scripted reality television show airing on Food Network.  The show follows six chefs from the Big City Chefs private chef placement agency in Beverly Hills, California.  The show chronicles preparations for lavish parties for eccentric clientele in the Los Angeles area.

A lawsuit was filed against Food Network, claiming the show's idea was stolen from a private chef firm not associated with the show. The private chef firm tried to stop Food Network from airing the show's second-season premiere, which aired on October 12, 2010.

Episodes
Six private chefs are hired to prepare food for the high-end people in L.A. They have to prepare what the client asks for, which is sometimes an issue, and there are many moments of drama, comedy, and disaster.

Season 1
 Pilot (Into the Fryer)
 In the Dog House
 Foodzilla
 Rockin' Rolls
 Challah Back
 It Ain't Easy Being Green
 Teenage Tasteland

Season 2
Couch Potatoes
Catching Fire
Eddie's Enchilada "Surprise"
Knead More Time
Laughing My Bass Off
Da Game is to Be Sold
Tha Last Meal

Season 3
A Side of Lamas
A Very "Brady" Birthday
Seance Sautee
Thrilla for Foodzilla
Tickled Pink
Who's the Boss
Flappers and Knee Slappers
Whole Lotta Loaf

References

External links
 
 

Food Network original programming
2009 American television series debuts
2011 American television series endings